Flavoparmelia plicata is a species of corticolous (bark-dwelling), foliose lichen in the family Parmeliaceae. Found in Brazil, it was formally described as a new species in 2014 by lichenologists André Aptroot and Marcela Cáceres. The type specimen was collected by the authors from the Parque Natural Municipal de Porto Velho (Rondônia), where it was found growing on the smooth bark of a tree near a rainforest. It contains usnic acid and protocetraric acid. The lichen shares many characteristics with the cosmopolitan species Flavoparmelia caperata, but differs from that species mainly in the form of its isidia.

References

Parmeliaceae
Lichen species
Lichens described in 2014
Lichens of Brazil
Taxa named by André Aptroot
Taxa named by Marcela Cáceres